Frederick Lincoln Small (1866 – January 15, 1918) was the convicted murderer of his wife, Florence Aileen Curry Small, in New Hampshire. Mr. and Mrs. Small took out a joint life insurance policy of $20,000 USD on March 16, 1916, from the John Hancock Company of Boston. The policy was written that the other spouse would collect if one spouse died. Mr. Small was 49 and Mrs. Small was 37 years old. One premium of $1,107.60 was paid before the incident. Mr. Small had two previous mysterious fires before the one that claimed the life of his third wife Florence.

Her body was found in the ruins of her burnt Ossipee Lake two-story cottage on September 28, 1916. Mr. Small had been at the cottage that evening, but was traveling back to Boston when the body was found. Mrs. Small's skull was crushed and also had a cord wrapped around her neck. She had also been shot, and there was evidence she had been chloroformed. The body would have been destroyed by the fire except for the fact that the fire had compromised the floor of the cottage. The body was found floating in the flooded basement.

At first the alibi of being in Boston was a good one, until investigators discovered an alarm clock, spark plug, fire screen, clock spring and some hairpins to make a timed arson device. Mr. Small was known to be a tinkerer who enjoyed mechanical projects. A local grocer reported that he delivered five gallons of kerosene to the Small’s cottage just before the fire.

Small's reaction 
Small was standing outside the remains of the cottage when the medical examiner asked what he wanted done with his wife's remains.
All he said "What?, is there enough left of the body for a casket?" He later put down about $30 for the cheapest one he could find. This raised suspension of Small's involvement.

Mr. Small offered a $1,000 reward for information leading to the murderer after he was taken into custody. The authorities were already making a case against him by that time.

Previous marriages and early life 

He was married three times. His first wife, Nettie Davis of Minot, Maine, died during childbirth on March 14, 1891. She was 22 years old.

In 1909 Small sued Arthur Soden, who was the president/part owner of the baseball team, Boston Beaneaters of the National League, for $500,000 USD. Small claimed that Soden had alienated the affections of Small's second wife, Laura Patterson. At the time the damage amount of the lawsuit requested was the largest in United States history, the equivalent of almost 12 million today's US dollars. Soden was ordered to pay Small a judgment of $10,000.

Around 1893, Mr. Small was employed in Boston as a real estate agent, he also was a stock broker. He was moderately successful in both ventures.

Aftermath of the crime 
Small went on trial at the newly built Carroll County Court House. At the time, the trial was very sensational. Many reporters from Boston covered the trial and there were quite a few spectators. On Jan. 8, 1917, a jury found Frederick Small guilty of murder.

The State of New Hampshire executed Small by hanging on January 15, 1918. Small was the second of only three people executed by the state of New Hampshire in the 20th century. The other two were Oscar Comery in 1916 and Howard Long in 1939.

Mrs. Small is currently buried in the Grant Hill Cemetery in Center Ossipee. Through the efforts of the Ossipee Historical Society and citizens of Ossipee, Florence Small was given a proper ceremony on the 91st anniversary of her death, and her site is now identified with a marker.

See also
 Capital punishment in New Hampshire
 Capital punishment in the United States
 List of people executed in New Hampshire

Literature
Petrie, Janice S. C., PERFECTION TO A FAULT: A SMALL MURDER IN OSSIPEE, NEW HAMPSHIRE, 1916, Seatales Publishing Company, Topsfield, Massachusetts, (2000), 152pp, good, wraps (softcover) signed by the author, . When Florence Small's smoldering body rose to the surface of the basement water, local folks immediately suspected her husband, Frederick Small, of the crime.

References

1866 births
1918 deaths
American people convicted of murder
People executed for murder
20th-century executions by New Hampshire
People executed by New Hampshire by hanging
20th-century executions of American people
People convicted of murder by New Hampshire
Uxoricides
Murderers for life insurance money